is a former Japanese football player and manager. He played for Japan national team.

Club career
Kawakatsu was born in Kyoto on April 5, 1958. After graduating from Hosei University, he joined Japan Soccer League Division 2 club Toshiba in 1981. In 1983, he moved to Yomiuri. The club won the league champions in 1983, 1984 and 1986–87. The club also won 1984, 1986, 1987 Emperor's Cup and 1985 JSL Cup. He moved to his local club Kyoto Shiko in 1989 and Tokyo Gas in 1990. He retired in 1991.

National team career
On February 8, 1981, when Kawakatsu was a Hosei University student, he debuted for Japan national team against Malaysia. He played 13 games for Japan until 1982.

Coaching career
After retirement, Kawakatsu started coaching career at Tokyo Gas in 1991. In 1992, he moved to Verdy Kawasaki (later Tokyo Verdy). In 1997, he managed at 1997 Emperor's Cup as Valdir Espinosa successor. In September 1998, he became a manager as Nicanor de Carvalho successor. In 1999, he moved to Vissel Kobe. He was sacked in July 2002. In June 2006, he signed with Avispa Fukuoka as Hiroshi Matsuda successor. However the club was relegated to J2 League and he resigned. In 2010, he returned to Tokyo Verdy and managed until September 2012. In June 2014, he signed with Kyoto Sanga FC and managed until end of season.

Club statistics

National team statistics

Managerial statistics

References

External links

Japan National Football Team Database

1958 births
Living people
Hosei University alumni
Association football people from Kyoto Prefecture
Japanese footballers
Japan international footballers
Japan Soccer League players
Hokkaido Consadole Sapporo players
Tokyo Verdy players
Kyoto Sanga FC players
FC Tokyo players
Japanese football managers
J1 League managers
J2 League managers
Tokyo Verdy managers
Vissel Kobe managers
Avispa Fukuoka managers
Kyoto Sanga FC managers
Association football midfielders